Belses is a village on the Ale Water, in the Scottish Borders area of Scotland the former Selkirkshire. It is situated close to Old Belses, and lies south of St Boswells, west of Jedburgh, north of Hawick, and east of Selkirk.

Other places nearby include Ancrum, Ashkirk, Belses, Hassendean, Lilliesleaf, Minto, Old Belses, and Salenside.

Belses was the site of a railway station on the former Waverley Line, a double track railway which linked Edinburgh with Carlisle. The NBR (North British Railway) closed in 1969.

See also
Belses railway station (redirects to Waverley Line)
List of places in the Scottish Borders
List of places in Scotland
List of closed railway stations in Britain

Sources
Evans,D (1985) 'Practical Plans, Stow and Belses', ''Practical Model Railways, vol.June 1985, page(s):32-3

External links

RCAHMS entry for Belses Station
SCRAN: image of a North British Railway Stencil
Robin Barbour collection: Images of Belses Station from the 1960s
Geograph images of Belses station
Waverley Route Heritage Association

Villages in the Scottish Borders